Jayasinghe Arachchige Milton Perera (5 May 1938 – 24 October 1991), popularly known as Milton Perera, was a singer, composer and playback singer of Sri Lankan cinema. One of the most respected artists in Sri Lanka, Milton Perera rendered his voice to diverse array of artists as a playback singer for many films in a career spanned for more than three decades. He was the leading playback singer of Sri Lankan cinema during the 1960s and 1970s.

Personal life

Milton was born on May 5, 1938 the son of J. A. Edwin Perera, also known as Tabla Podi Appuhamy, an accomplished tabla player. His mother was Prema Wickramarachchi. Inspired by his father, Milton became proficient on the Tabla at a young age. Perera was a skinny, innocent young man of Podi Appuhamy. They lived in Sangamitta Mawata, Kotahena, known as Green Street. His father was a proud owner of series of small houses in a land along the street. Father and Milton lived in one of those houses.  All other houses were rented. The first house of Podi Appuhamay was rented and that man had a beautiful daughter, named Hemalatha. She was so  beautiful, sexy looking, and studied at the nearby school at the Green Street, known as Kotahena Madhya Maha Vidyalaya.

Milton has been trying to express his love to Mala Hemalatha. She was popularly known as Mala. He sent love letters to Mala through other students at the Schools and they were in love in no time. So Milton sang, 'Aranna Adare Mala', dedicated to his girl friend. They married and had Priyankara as only child. Later Mala left Milton and lived with a Muslim man.  

Milton was later married to Kalyani Perera, who had been an actress. Their wedding was celebrated on 26 September 1969. They had three sons: Chalaka Chamupathi, Arosha Asanga and Pamoda Piyushan. Milton died on October 24, 1991. In memory of Milton, Priyankara Perera and Chalaka Chamupathi Perera continue to perform J.A Milton Perera's songs.

Eldest son Priyankara Perera is married to renowned actress Dilhani Ekanayake and they have one son Dilmin Perera. His second son Chalaka Chamupathi Perera is married to Padmi Ranasinghe, and they have one daughter Anjana Dasuni Perera and one son Chamath Chamupathi Perera.

Musical career
Popular singer H. R. Jothipala introduced Milton to Sripali Wayman to the Velenda Sewaya of Radio Ceylon. In 1940, Milton sang his first song for Radio Ceylon, "Alehi Bendi Jeewitha". It was written by Aloy Gunawardena around a Mohamed Sally melody. However, his father died five days before the song was aired. He subsequently had several popular songs on the radio, "Podi Kale Api Denna," "Oba Wewa Wewa Pahana Mage", "Sikuru liya Komala liya" and "Kalyaniye." Milton was very close with Alloy Gunawardene, Jothipala and Karunaratne Abeysekera. Milton along with Jothipala sang 'Song Debate' which became known as 'Ananga Wadaya' in the music world with the help of Karunaratne Abeysekera and Gunaratne Abeysekera.

At the age of 14, when Raj Kapoor, Nargis Thalada and a group of actors came to Sri Lanka in 1954, he got to play the Tabla for their dancing and singing by Thalad Mohammad. He also played Dholak at special festivals. Milton rose to prominence as a film playback singer in the 1960s. Milton debut to playback singing came with a song on Kurulu Bedda (1961). In his 30 year career in the field, he provided his voice to actors like Gamini Fonseka, Joe Abeywickrama, Tony Ranasinghe, Vijaya Kumaratunga, Ananda Jayaratne, D. R. Nanayakkara, Anthony C. Perera and Stanley Perera in such films as Adata Wediya Heta Hondai, Dheewarayo, Yatagiya Dawasa, Allapu Gedara, Bicycle Hora, Daru Duka, Sarawita, Ataweni Pudumaya, Chandiya and Deiyange Theenduwa. Milton won Award for the Best Singer at the 1966 Sarasavi Awards and was named the Most Popular Singer of the Year at the Golden Sankha Awards sponsored by Vogue Jewelers the same year.

The Sinhala Baila song Pissu Vikare (Dagena Polkatu Male) by H. R. Jothipala, Milton Perera, M. S. Fernando is a cover version of the Tamil song Dingiri Dingale (Meenachi) from the 1958 Tamil film Anbu Engey. And it was covered again in Sinhala as a folk song named Digisi/Digiri Digare (Kussiye Badu).

Filmography

References

External links
 Milton Perera - මිල්ටන් පෙරේරා  Songs on line

Sri Lankan Buddhists
20th-century Sri Lankan male singers
Sinhalese singers

1938 births
1991 deaths
Hindustani musicians